Oliver A. Smith (born 13 September 1960) is a Turks and Caicos Islands football executive and former manager of the national team of Turks and Caicos Islands. He is currently the general secretary of the Turks and Caicos Islands Football Association.

References

1960 births
Living people
Turks and Caicos Islands national football team managers
Turks and Caicos Islands football managers